Orlando Claude Brown Jr. (born May 2, 1996) is an American football offensive tackle for the Cincinnati Bengals of the National Football League (NFL). He played college football at Oklahoma, and was drafted by the Baltimore Ravens in the third round of the 2018 NFL Draft. Brown is the son of offensive tackle Orlando Brown, who also played for the Ravens.

High school career
Brown Jr. attended Peachtree Ridge High School in Suwanee, Georgia, where he played high school football. He was a three-star prospect. He received scholarship offers from Tennessee, Oklahoma, Alabama, Arkansas, and Auburn. Brown initially committed to Tennessee but changed his commitment to Oklahoma.

College career 
Brown redshirted his freshman year at Oklahoma in 2014. In 2015, he was named the starting left tackle. On January 3, 2018, Brown announced he was forgoing his senior year and entering the 2018 NFL Draft.

Professional career

NFL Draft
On January 3, 2018, Brown announced his decision to forgo his remaining eligibility and enter the 2018 NFL Draft. Brown attended the NFL Scouting Combine in Indianapolis and performed all of the combine and positional drills, but had a poor performance. His 40-yard dash time was the slowest among any prospect at the combine and was described as a "historically bad time" by NFL analyst Mike Mayock. He also finished last in the bench press, vertical jump, and broad jump among all offensive linemen at the combine. The performance possibly hurt his draft stock after he was widely considered a first round pick among draft experts and scouts.

He fared poorly at the combine, putting up 14 reps on bench press, 5.85 40-yard dash (same as his father's Pro Day score), 82-inch broad jump, and a 19.5 vertical jump. He recovered at his Pro Day, achieving better results in all categories, including 18 reps on bench press, 5.63 40 yard dash, 89" broad jump and 25.5" vertical jump.

At Oklahoma's pro day he improved his 40-yard dash (5.68s), 20-yard dash (3.28s), 10-yard dash (1.88s), bench press (18), vertical jump (25 1/2"), and broad jump (7'5"). Brown attended visits and private workouts with multiple teams, including the Jacksonville Jaguars, Baltimore Ravens, Philadelphia Eagles, and Detroit Lions. At the conclusion of the pre-draft process, Brown was projected to be a second or third round pick by NFL draft experts and scouts. He was ranked as the fourth best offensive tackle in the draft by Sports Illustrated, was ranked the sixth best offensive tackle DraftScout.com and Scouts Inc., and was ranked the eighth best offensive tackle by NFL analyst Mike Mayock.

Baltimore Ravens
The Baltimore Ravens selected Brown in the third round (83rd overall) of the 2018 NFL Draft. Brown was the ninth offensive tackle drafted in 2018 and was considered by analysts to be one of the biggest steals in the draft.

On May 16, 2018, the Baltimore Ravens signed Brown to a four-year, $3.49 million contract that included a signing bonus of $865,720. In his rookie season, he appeared in all 16 games and started 10 games at right tackle. He started in the Wild Card loss to the Los Angeles Chargers.

On January 15, 2020, Brown, who had been named as an alternate at offensive tackle to the 2020 Pro Bowl, was added to the active Pro Bowl roster, replacing injured Oakland Raider Trent Brown. Brown was named to his second Pro Bowl in 2020.

Kansas City Chiefs
On April 23, 2021, Brown was traded to the Kansas City Chiefs, along with a second-round pick (58th overall) in the 2021 NFL Draft and a sixth-round pick in the 2022 NFL Draft, in exchange for the Chiefs' first-round pick (31st overall) in the 2021 NFL Draft, a third-round pick (94th overall), a fourth-round pick (136th overall) and a 2022 fifth-round selection. Brown was named to the Pro Bowl on his first season with the team.

The Chiefs placed the non-exclusive franchise tag on Brown on March 7, 2022. After failing to reach a long-term contract, he signed his franchise tag tender on August 2, 2022. The tender was worth $16.7 million. Brown helped the Chiefs win Super Bowl LVII against the Philadelphia Eagles 38-35 to give Brown his first Super Bowl victory.

Cincinnati Bengals
On March 17, 2023, Brown signed a four-year, $64 million contract with the Cincinnati Bengals.

References

External links
 
 Oklahoma Sooners bio
 Baltimore Ravens bio
 Kansas City Chiefs bio

1996 births
Living people
People from Duluth, Georgia
Sportspeople from the Atlanta metropolitan area
Players of American football from Georgia (U.S. state)
American football offensive tackles
Oklahoma Sooners football players
All-American college football players
Baltimore Ravens players
Kansas City Chiefs players
American Conference Pro Bowl players
Cincinnati Bengals players